Draba monoensis is an uncommon species of flowering plant in the mustard family known by the common names White Mountains draba and Mono draba.

It is endemic to Mono County, California, where it grows in moist, rocky habitat in the alpine climate of the White Mountains.

Description

External links

Jepson Manual Treatment — Draba monoensis
USDA Plants Profile: Draba monoensis (White Mountains draba)
Flora of North America
Draba monoensis  — U.C. Photo gallery

monoensis
Endemic flora of California
Alpine flora
Natural history of Mono County, California
Plants described in 1988